Freedom Air Services was an airline based in Kaduna, Nigeria. It operated scheduled domestic services and charter flights within West Africa. Its main bases were Mallam Aminu International Airport, Kano and Murtala Mohammed International Airport, Lagos.

History 

The airline was established on 28 May 1998 and started operations in October 2001 . It is owned by ADF (40%), Garba Kabo Shitu (founder and chief executive) (20%), Moh Garba Shitu (20%) and Yusufu Garba Shitu (20%).

Destinations 

Freedom Air Services operated services to the following domestic scheduled destinations (at January 2005): Abuja, Kaduna, Kano, Lagos and Maiduguri.

Fleet 

The Freedom Air Services fleet consisted of the following aircraft (at March 2007):
1 Boeing 727-200

Previously operated
At August 2006  the airline also operated a further:
2 Boeing 727-200

References

External links 
Freedom Air Services (archived) 

Defunct airlines of Nigeria
Airlines established in 1998
Airlines disestablished in 2007